Douglas G. Bischoff (1926–12 May 1991) was a professional optometrist, Republican politician and party worker in Utah. He served as Deputy Chief of Staff to Utah Governor Norman H. Bangerter, after serving as a state senator. He was a leader in the Utah Republican Party, serving as Republican Party Chairman and chairing Ronald Reagan's presidential campaigns in the state. He was elected to the Utah State Senate three times between 1969 and 1976.

Personal life
Bischoff received his bachelor's degree from the University of Utah. He later received his Doctor of Optometry from Columbia University.

Bischoff was a member of the Church of Jesus Christ of Latter-day Saints (LDS Church), where he served as a member of the high council in the Mt. Olympus North Stake. He served as an LDS missionary in West Germany.  He was the president of the Switzerland Zurich Mission from 1980 to 1983.

Bischoff and his wife, Cohleen Jensen, are the parents of two children.

References

External links
Mormon Times, April 25, 2008
 Swiss Mission site

1936 births
American Mormon missionaries in Austria
American Mormon missionaries in Switzerland
University of Utah alumni
Brigham Young University faculty
1991 deaths
Mission presidents (LDS Church)
American leaders of the Church of Jesus Christ of Latter-day Saints
20th-century Mormon missionaries
American optometrists
Republican Party Utah state senators
Latter Day Saints from Utah
Columbia University Vagelos College of Physicians and Surgeons alumni
20th-century American politicians